Bonfiglioli is an Italian surname. Notable people with the surname include:

Alessandra Bonfiglioli (born 1963), Italian high jumper
Kyril Bonfiglioli (1928–1985), English art-dealer, magazine editor, and comic novelist

Italian-language surnames